Al-Jabalain Football Club is a professional football club based in Ha'il, Saudi Arabia, that plays in the Prince Mohammad bin Salman League, the second tier of Saudi football. It was founded in 1959.

Al-Jabalain have won the Saudi First Division once, in the 1979–80 season, and have finished as runners-up once in the 1983–84 season. The club have spent 3 non-consecutive seasons in the Pro League and won their first promotion during the 1979–80 season. They last played in the Pro League during the 1984–85 season.

The club play their home games at Prince Abdul Aziz bin Musa'ed Stadium in Ha'il, sharing the stadium with city rivals Al-Tai, with whom they contest the Ha'il derby with.

Honours
Saudi First Division
Winners (1): 1979–80
Runners-up (1): 1983–84
Saudi Second Division
Winners (1): 2017–18
Runners-up (1): 2001–02
Saudi Third Division
Winners (1): 2014–15
Runners-up (1): 1999–00 
Prince Faisal bin Fahd Cup for Division 1 and 2 Teams
Runners-up (1): 1996–97, 2002–03

Current squad 

As of 1 November 2020:

References

External links
 Official site

Jabalain
Jabalain
Jabalain
Jabalain